"Volunteers" is a Jefferson Airplane single from 1969 that was released to promote the album Volunteers two months before the album's release. It was written by Marty Balin and Paul Kantner. Balin was woken up by a truck one morning, which happened to be a truck with Volunteers of America painted on the side. Marty started writing lyrics down and then asked Paul to help him with the music.

Chart performance

B-Side "We Can Be Together"
"We Can Be Together" is the B-side of the "Volunteers" 45 and the first track on Volunteers. The song's music and lyrics were written by Paul Kantner. Kantner was inspired by the Black Panther Party's use of the phrase "Up against the wall, motherfucker" and included it in the chorus.  The Airplane performed "We Can Be Together" uncensored on The Dick Cavett Show on August 19, 1969.

While the word "motherfucker" was indeed sung and not censored on the 45, it was mixed lower in the mix as compared to the LP mix, which had no volume manipulation and presented the song "un-buried".

Personnel
Grace Slick – piano, vocals
Marty Balin – guitar, lead vocals
Paul Kantner – rhythm guitar, vocals
Jorma Kaukonen – lead guitar
Jack Casady – bass
Spencer Dryden – drums, percussion

Additional personnel
Nicky Hopkins – piano

Cover versions
Balin released a new version on his 1991 solo album, Better Generation.

Notes

1969 songs
Jefferson Airplane songs
Songs written by Marty Balin
Songs written by Paul Kantner
Song recordings produced by Al Schmitt
Protest songs
RCA Victor singles